Jahidur Rahman (born 11 January 1959) is a Bangladesh Nationalist Party politician and a former Jatiya Sangsad member representing the Thakurgaon-3 constituency. He resigned from the position on 11 December 2022.

Career
Rahman was elected to parliament from Thakurgaon-3 as a Bangladesh Nationalist Party candidate 30 December 2018. He took his oath as Member of Parliament against the wishes of his party, which wanted a boycott of the parliament.

References

1959 births
Living people
Bangladesh Nationalist Party politicians
11th Jatiya Sangsad members